Vincetoxicum cameroonicum is a species of flowering plant in the family Apocynaceae, native from Benin to Uganda in tropical Africa. It was first described by N. E. Brown in 1895 as Tylophora cameroonica.

Distribution
Vincetoxicum cameroonicum is native to mainly western tropical Africa: Benin, Cameroon, the Democratic Republic of the Congo, the Republic of the Congo, Ivory Coast, Nigeria and Uganda.

Conservation
Tylophora cameroonica was assessed as "near threatened" in the 2000 IUCN Red List, where it is said to be native only to Cameroon, the Democratic Republic of the Congo, and Uganda. , T. cameroonica was regarded as a synonym of Vincetoxicum cameroonicum, which has a wider distribution.

References

cameroonicum
Flora of Benin
Flora of Cameroon
Flora of the Republic of the Congo
Flora of Ivory Coast
Flora of Nigeria
Flora of Uganda
Flora of the Democratic Republic of the Congo
Plants described in 1895